Sir Archibald Howie  (12 May 1879 – 26 October 1943) was a Scottish-born Australian politician.

Early life
He was born in Glasgow to mason Archibald Howie and Janet Ferguson. His family migrated to New South Wales in 1881, and Howie became a building contractor, eventually taking over his father's business. In 1912 he married Emily Clara Manuelle, with whom he had a son. In 1927 he was elected for a single term as President of the Master Builders Association of New South Wales.

Political career
From 1934 to 1941 he was a member of Sydney City Council, and from 1934 to 1943 he was a United Australia Party member of the New South Wales Legislative Council. He was knighted in the 1938 New Year Honours. In 1939 he was appointed a Fellow of the Senate of the University of Sydney, serving until his death. He was president of the Royal Agricultural Society of New South Wales from 1941 until his death.

Howie died at his Hunters Hill residence, "Clifton" in Woolwich Road, which had been his home since 1919, on 26 October 1943. His funeral was held at St Stephen's Presbyterian Church on Macquarie Street and he was buried in South Head Cemetery.

References

 

1879 births
1943 deaths
Australian builders
Australian chairpersons of corporations
Australian corporate directors
People educated at Sydney Boys High School
United Australia Party members of the Parliament of New South Wales
Members of the New South Wales Legislative Council
Australian Knights Bachelor
Civic Reform Association politicians
Scottish emigrants to colonial Australia
Mayors and Lord Mayors of Sydney